Helcyra hemina, the white emperor, is a species of brush-footed butterfly found in parts of India and in Myanmar and Java.

In India this species is protected under Schedule I of the Wildlife (Protection) Act, 1972.

Subspecies
Helcyra hemina hemina (Sikkim, Assam, Burma)
Helcyra hemina masinia Fruhstorfer, 1903 (western Java)

References

Apaturinae
Butterflies described in 1864
Butterflies of Java
Butterflies of Asia
Taxa named by William Chapman Hewitson